This is a list of proposed currencies. Currencies are listed by their latest significant proposal.

19th century
 Perun, planned to be introduced by Petar II Petrović-Njegoš in Montenegro
 Romanat

20th century
 ANCAP
 Bancor, an international currency proposed by John Maynard Keynes at the Bretton Woods Conference
 Gaucho, between Argentina and Brazil
 Metica, in Mozambique
 Terra

2000s
 Amero, in a currency union for North America consisting of the United States, Canada, and Mexico
 CARICOM currency, for Caribbean states (except the Bahamas)
 Khaleeji, for the Gulf Cooperation Council 
 SUCRE, as part of the Bolivarian Alternative for the Americas

2010s
 Afro, proposed currency for the African Union to be issued by the African Central Bank, expected to be introduced in the 2020s
 Asian Currency Unit, proposed for the ASEAN +3 or the East Asian Community (including the ASEAN member-states, China, South Korea, and Japan)
 Caribbean guilder, to replace the Netherlands Antillean guilder in Curaçao and Sint Maarten in the 2020s
 East African shilling, for the East African Community 
 Eco, for the West African Monetary Zone , planned to be introduced in the 2020s and merged with the CFA franc and eventually the Afro. 
 Toman, a replacement for the Iranian rial proposed by the Central Bank of Iran due to hyperinflation

References

historical
 
Currencies